Pocahontas Fuel Company Store and Office Buildings are a historic company store and an office building located at Jenkinjones, McDowell County, West Virginia.  Both buildings were designed by architect Alex B. Mahood and built in 1917. They were listed on the National Register of Historic Places in 1992.

History
Born in Glynneath, Wales, Jenkin B. Jones (1841-1916), the namesake for the coal town of Jenkinjones, West Virginia, founded the Pocahontas Fuel Company after consolidating several coal mining operations in 1907.  The two buildings were constructed to be durable and also as a symbol of success within the community.

Description

The two-story brick company store sits on a stone foundation. It features a brick cornice with a concrete parapet and a concrete entablature with dentils in the Classical Revival style.  The store building housed the store and a post office.

The office is a two-story brick building with a flat roof.  It has a bold concrete cornice with dentils across the front facade.

See also 
 Pocahontas Fuel Company Store (Maybeury, West Virginia)
 Pocahontas Fuel Company Store (Switchback, West Virginia)

References

Alex B. Mahood buildings
Commercial buildings completed in 1917
Neoclassical architecture in West Virginia
Office buildings on the National Register of Historic Places in West Virginia
National Register of Historic Places in McDowell County, West Virginia
Company stores in the United States